Herbert George Nicholas, FBA (1911–1998) was a Welsh historian and academic. He was the Rhodes Professor of American History and Institutions at the University of Oxford from 1969 to 1978, and was also a fellow of New College, Oxford, from 1951 to 1978. He had been educated at New College and had been a lecturer (from 1938) and fellow (1946 to 1951) of Exeter College, Oxford. He was both a fellow of Nuffield College, Oxford, and a Nuffield Reader in the Comparative Study of Institutions from 1956 to 1969. He was elected a fellow of the British Academy in 1969 and served as its vice-president from 1975 to 1976.

References 

1911 births
1998 deaths
20th-century Welsh historians
Political scientists
Historians of the United States
Alumni of New College, Oxford
Fellows of New College, Oxford
Fellows of Exeter College, Oxford
Fellows of Nuffield College, Oxford
Academics of the University of Oxford
Fellows of the British Academy